Dennis K. Chesney is an American astronomer and discoverer of minor planets born in Clovis, New Mexico, and credited by the Minor Planet Center with the discovery of 38 numbered minor planets during 1998–2000. As of 2016, his only named discovery is the outer main-belt asteroid 12583 Buckjean, which he named after his parents. It was they who had gavin him a pair of binoculars for Christmas, that ultimately led to his many asteroid discoveries. Naming citation was published on 20 March 2000.

List of discovered minor planets

References 
 

20th-century  American  astronomers
Discoverers of asteroids

Living people
Year of birth missing (living people)
People from Clovis, New Mexico